School Field Ground is a sports ground owned by Cranbrook School located in the town of Cranbrook, Kent. It is known by the school as Big Side Playing Field.

Cricket history
The ground has been used as a cricket field since at least the mid 19th century, at which point it was in private hands. Kent County Cricket Club played two first-class cricket matches on a ground specifically prepared on the site, one in 1850 and the other in 1851, both against England XIs. Kent also played two first-class matches at nearby Swifts Park in 1862–63.

The ground has been used by the school since the 1940s, including for matches against teams such as MCC. Both a South African Universities team and a South Africa Schools XI played on the ground in 1967 whilst apartheid was in operation. In July 1968 Free Foresters played a United States team on the ground.

References

External links
School Field Ground on Cricinfo

Cricket grounds in Kent
Sports venues completed in 1850